Tinsley railway station was a railway station in Sheffield, South Yorkshire, England, opened in March 1869.  This station was designed by the company architect John Holloway Sanders. The station served the growing community of Tinsley and the workers at the nearby steelworks which had moved to or had been founded in the lower Don Valley following major changes in manufacturing methods in the mid - late 19th century.  The station, opened by the South Yorkshire Railway, was built on the line between Sheffield Victoria and Barnsley and became a junction station with the opening of the line from Tinsley Junction (later Tinsley South Junction) to the original Rotherham station by the Manchester, Sheffield and Lincolnshire Railway.  The station was located by the main Sheffield to Rotherham road in Tinsley, now on the Sheffield side of M1, Junction 34 in Tinsley.

The station had two platforms, flanking the running lines, and was surrounded by sidings belonging to steel works, in particular Hadfields.  Because of the gradients on the line to Barnsley this was also the site of the siding, to the rear of the Barnsley-bound platform, for the "Tinsley Banker", a locomotive, or sometimes locomotives, whose job was to assist (bank / push) trains up the gradients.  The station was closed on 29 October 1951.

The Tinsley layout was completed with the opening of the "Tinsley Curve" which enabled trains to run directly from the "Blackburn Valley" line to Rotherham.  Although the station is now closed, the station buildings are still present near the new footbridge, which crosses over the line and Sheffield Supertram.  The Sheffield Supertram now runs along this part of the old line and the nearest tram stop is Tinsley/Meadowhall South.

About 3/4 mile towards Sheffield, along Sheffield Road, is the site of West Tinsley railway station.

References

D. L. Franks. South Yorkshire Railway notes. "Forward", Journal of the Great Central Society. . 
S.R.Batty.  "Rail Centres - Sheffield"

Disused railway stations in Sheffield
Former Great Central Railway stations
Railway stations in Great Britain opened in 1869
Railway stations in Great Britain closed in 1951
1869 establishments in England
John Holloway Sanders railway stations